Jōkō-ji (常光寺) is a Buddhist temple in Yao, Osaka Prefecture, Japan. It was founded in the Nara Period by Gyōki.

See also 
Thirteen Buddhist Sites of Osaka

External links 

Buddhist temples in Osaka Prefecture
Gyōki